Mount Palmer can refer to:

Mountains
 Mount Palmer (Alaska), USA
 Mount Palmer (Alberta), Canada
 Mount Palmer (Antarctica)
 Mount Palmer (California), USA
 Mount Palmer (New South Wales), Australia
 Mount Palmer (Yukon), Canada

Locations
 Mount Palmer, Western Australia